The name Allen's rice rat has been used for the following oryzomyines:
Sigmodontomys alfari , Alfaro's rice water rat
Hylaeamys perenensis, Western Amazonian oryzomys

Animal common name disambiguation pages